

Offseason
Sept. 15: In the ECAC preseason coaches poll, Harvard was picked to finish second. Harvard is one of only two teams to earn more than 100 points in the pol. Two-time defending league champion Cornell took first, gathering 121 total points and 11 first-place votes.
Oct. 6: Former Crimson player Angela Ruggiero will be inducted into the National Italian Sports Hall of Fame. Ruggiero's induction will occur on October 22 in Chicago.

Recruiting

Exhibition

Regular season
November 12: Hillary Crowe recorded her first career goal and assist in the same contest versus the Cornell Big Red. The first assist of her NCAA career  came on the first NCAA goal for Sarah Edney.
 January 13 to 14: Hillary Crowe registered four points in two ECAC conference wins versus RPI and Union. Of note, she assisted on the game-winning goals in both contests. In the win versus RPI, Crowe contributed with three assists in a come from behind win.
February 3: Jillian Dempsey helped the Crimson come back from a 2-0 deficit versus Quinnipiac. In a 4-2 final tally, she registered her ninth multi-point game of the year.
February 4: Dempsey was one goal short of tying the NCAA record for goals in a game, netting five against Princeton. With Harvard behind 1-0 in the second period, she netted three straight markers for a natural hat trick. Late in the second, she added her fourth of the frame. Dempsey recorded a power-play and a short-handed goal also. Her fifth goal came with 41 seconds remaining in the contest.
February 7: The Crimson faced a three-goal third-period deficit, and lost the Women's Beanpot consolation game to Boston College at Walter Brown Arena. The 4-2 loss marks the first time since 1993 that the Crimson finished fourth at the annual Beanpot.

Standings

Schedule

Conference record

Awards and honors
Laura Bellamy, ECAC Defensive Player of the Week (Week of November 21, 2011)
 Hillary Crowe, ECAC Rookie of the Week (Week of January 17, 2012)
Jillian Dempsey, ECAC Player of the Week (Week of December 12, 2011)
Jillian Dempsey, ECAC Player of the Week (Week of February 6, 2012)
Jillian Dempsey, Harvard Athlete of the Week (Week of February 6, 2012)
Jillian Dempsey, ECAC Player of the Week (Week of February 28, 2012)
Jillian Dempsey, Finalist, ECAC Player of the Year (2011–12)
Samantha Reber, ECAC Rookie of the Week (Week of December 12, 2011)
Samantha Reber, ECAC Player of the Week (Week of February 6, 2012)

References

Harvard
Harvard Crimson women's ice hockey seasons
Harvard Crimson
Harvard Crimson women's ice hockey
Harvard Crimson women's ice hockey
Harvard Crimson women's ice hockey
Harvard Crimson women's ice hockey